The National Association for the Vindication of Scottish Rights was established in 1853. The first body to publicly articulate dissatisfaction with the Union since the Highland Potato Famine and the nationalist revolts in mainland Europe during the 1840s, it was closely associated with the Tories and was motivated by a desire to secure more focus on Scottish problems in response to what they felt was undue attention being focused on Ireland by the then Liberal government. The short-lived body attracted few notable figures and was wound up in 1856.

The Association claimed that Ireland received more generous treatment than Scotland. It argued that the United Kingdom should always be designated 'Great Britain' and that Scotland ought to send more MPs to Westminster. These were relatively minor issues, and presented no serious challenge to the Establishment. Nevertheless, the Association was an important preliminary step in the campaign for Scottish Home Rule.

Public supporters of the movement included Lord Eglinton, who moved a petition on behalf of the Association in the House of Lords in April 1854, and Professor William Aytoun of the University of Edinburgh.

References

1853 establishments in Scotland
Home rule in the United Kingdom
1856 disestablishments in the United Kingdom
Political history of Scotland
Defunct organisations based in Scotland